Gallatin is a city in Daviess County, Missouri, United States. The population was 1,821 at the 2020 census. It is the county seat of Daviess County.

History
The territory now known as the county of Daviess, was initially inhabited by Sacs, Foxes, Pottawatomies and Musquakies. "The Treaty of 1837 removed the Sac and Fox Nation of Missouri into Kansas." "Gallatin was founded in 1837 and named for Albert Gallatin, America's longest-serving Secretary of the Treasury (1801–1814). Gallatin was incorporated in 1856.

The Gallatin Election Day Battle took place on 6 August 1838. About 200 people attempted to forcibly prevent Latter-day Saints (also known as Mormons) from voting in the newly created county's first election. In October 1838, David W. Patten led Mormon troops in the Daviess County expedition in which the Mormons burned and looted much of Gallatin, Millport and Grindstone Fork, consecrating the stolen goods to the bishop's storehouse. The skirmishes were part of the 1838 Mormon War. Gallatin is important in the Latter-day Saint religion; nearby is a place known to its members as  Adam-ondi-Ahman. They believe it to be the site where Adam and Eve lived after they had been expelled from the Garden of Eden.

In 1892, Grand River College moved from Edinburg, Missouri to Gallatin, where it operated for a period under the auspices of William Jewell College before it closed permanently in 1910 after a fire.

The Daviess County Rotary Jail and Sheriff's Residence, the A. Taylor Ray House and the Daviess County Courthouse are listed on the National Register of Historic Places.

Geography

Gallatin is located at the intersection of Missouri routes 6 and 13. The Grand River flows past about one mile east of the city.

Demographics

2010 census
As of the census of 2010, there were 1,786 people, 712 households, and 471 families living in the city. The racial makeup of the city was 98.0% White, 0.3% African American, 0.1% Native American, 0.1% Asian, and 1.5% from two or more races. Hispanic or Latino of any race were 0.7% of the population.

There were 712 households, of which 33.4% had children under the age of 18 living with them, 49.3% were married couples living together, 12.2% had a female householder with no husband present, 4.6% had a male householder with no wife present, and 33.8% were non-families. 30.3% of all households were made up of individuals, and 14% had someone living alone who was 65 years of age or older. The average household size was 2.47 and the average family size was 3.04.

The median age in the city was 38.6 years. 26.6% of residents were under the age of 18; 8.1% were between the ages of 18 and 24; 22.9% were from 25 to 44; 24.1% were from 45 to 64; and 18.3% were 65 years of age or older. The gender makeup of the city was 46.7% male and 53.3% female.

2000 census
As of the census of 2000, there were 1,789 people, 771 households, and 477 families living in the city. The population density was 640.1 people per square mile (246.7/km2). There were 905 housing units at an average density of 323.8 per square mile (124.8/km2). The racial makeup of the city was 99.27% White, 0.06% African American, 0.22% Native American, 0.06% from other races, and 0.39% from two or more races. Hispanic or Latino of any race were 0.39% of the population.

There were 771 households, out of which 31.0% had children under the age of 18 living with them, 49.5% were married couples living together, 9.9% had a female householder with no husband present, and 38.1% were non-families. 35.5% of all households were made up of individuals, and 20.2% had someone living alone who was 65 years of age or older. The average household size was 2.25 and the average family size was 2.92.

In the city, the population was spread out, with 25.8% under the age of 18, 7.2% from 18 to 24, 24.0% from 25 to 44, 20.7% from 45 to 64, and 22.3% who were 65 years of age or older. The median age was 40 years. For every 100 females, there were 83.3 males. For every 100 females age 18 and over, there were 76.5 males.

The median income for a household in the city was $32,321, and the median income for a family was $41,857. Males had a median income of $27,460 versus $27,448 for females. The per capita income for the city was $16,537. About 13.2% of families and 22.2% of the population were below the poverty line, including 30.2% of those under age 18 and 12.4% of those age 65 or over.

Education
PreK-12 public education is provided by the Gallatin R-V School District. PreK-4 is located at Covel D. Searcy Elementary School, 5–8 at Gallatin Middle School, and 9–12 at Gallatin High School.

Gallatin has the main branch of the Daviess County Library.

Media
Gallatin was served by a weekly newspaper, the Gallatin North Missourian, which circulated from 1865 to 2021.

Notable people
 Joshua Willis Alexander - U.S. Secretary of Commerce, 1919–1921
 Conrad Burns - U.S. Senator from Montana, 1989-2007
 Alexander Monroe Dockery - Governor of Missouri, 1901-1905
 Brice Garnett - professional golfer
 Mervin Kelly - physicist and engineer
 William Thornton Kemper Sr. - patriarch of the Missouri Kemper financial family
 Walter Page - jazz bassist
 Johnny Ringo - outlaw who briefly lived in the town

References

External links

Historic Gallatin Missouri 
 Historic maps of Gallatin in the Sanborn Maps of Missouri Collection at the University of Missouri

Cities in Missouri
Cities in Daviess County, Missouri
County seats in Missouri
Populated places established in 1837
1837 establishments in Missouri